The 1915 Chicago Maroons football team was an American football team that represented the University of Chicago during the 1915 college football season.  In their 24th season under head coach Amos Alonzo Stagg, the Maroons compiled a 5–2 record, finished in third place in the Western Conference, and outscored all opponents by a combined total of 83 to 50.

Schedule

References

Chicago
Chicago Maroons football seasons
Chicago Maroons football